ORiNOCO was the brand name for a family of wireless networking technology by Proxim Wireless (previously Lucent). These integrated circuits (codenamed Hermes) provide wireless connectivity for 802.11-compliant Wireless LANs.

Variants 

Lucent offered several variants of the PC Card, referred to by different color-based monikers:
 White/Bronze: WaveLAN IEEE Standard 2 Mbit/s PC Cards with 802.11 support.
 Silver: WaveLAN IEEE Turbo 11 Mbit/s PC Cards with 802.11b and 64-bit WEP support.
 Gold: WaveLAN IEEE Turbo 11 Mbit/s PC Cards with 802.11b and 128-bit WEP support.
Later models dropped the 'Turbo' moniker due to 802.11b 11 Mbit/s becoming widespread.

Proxim, after taking over Lucent's wireless division, rebranded all their wireless cards to ORiNOCO - even cards not based on Lucent/Agere's Hermes chipset. Proxim still offers ORiNOCO-based cards under the 'Classic' brand.

Rebranded products 
The WaveLAN chipsets that power ORiNOCO-branded cards were commonly used to power other wireless networking devices, and are compatible with a number of other access points, routers and wireless cards. The following brand and models utilise the chipset, or are rebrands of an ORiNOCO product:

 3Com AirConnect
 Apple AirPort and AirMac cards (original only, not AirPort Extreme). Modified to remove the antenna stub. 
 AVAYA World Card
 Cabletron RoamAbout 802.11 DS
 Compaq WL100 11 Mbit/s Wireless Adapter
 D-Link DWL-650
 ELSA AirLancer MC-11
 Enterasys RoamAbout
 Ericsson WLAN Card C11
 Farallon SkyLINE
 Fujitsu RoomWave
 HyperLink Wireless PC Card 11Mbit/s
 Intel PRO/Wireless 2011
 Lucent Technologies WaveLAN/IEEE Orinoco
 Melco WLI-PCM-L11
 Microsoft Wireless Notebook Adapter MN-520
 NCR WaveLAN/IEEE Adapter
 Proxim LAN PC CARD HARMONY 80211B
 Samsung 11Mbit/s WLAN Card
 Symbol LA4111 Spectrum24 Wireless LAN PC Card
 Toshiba Wireless LAN Mini PCI Card

Preferred wireless chipset for wardriving 
The ORiNOCO (and their derivatives) is preferred by wardrivers, due to their high sensitivity and the ability to report the level of noise (something that other chips do not report). The pre-Proxim (or 'Classic') ORiNOCO cards have a jack for attaching an external antenna.

Linux drivers 
A Linux Orinoco Driver supports the IEEE 802.11b Hermes/ORiNOCO family of chips.  It was included in the Linux kernel since version 2.4.3.

External links 
 MPL/GPL drivers
 Proxim Website for ORiNOCO
 ORiNOCO AP-8100

References 

Wireless networking hardware